Junaid Hartley (born 22 June 1978) is a South African football (soccer) player.

Career 
Hartley turned professional with Wits University at age 16. He moved abroad for spells with Vitória de Setúbal in the Primeira Liga and Lens in Ligue 1. He returned to South Africa where he played for Seven Stars, Orlando Pirates, Moroka Swallows, Ajax Cape Town, Jomo Cosmos and Maritzburg United. Hartley finished his career with Sarawak FA in the Malaysia Super League, and retired after his contract expired in February 2008.

International 
He is a former South Africa national football team players from 1997–1999, and he also played for South Africa national under-20 football team in 1997 FIFA World Youth Championship in Malaysia.

References

External links

1978 births
Living people
Sportspeople from Cape Town
South African soccer players
South Africa international soccer players
Bidvest Wits F.C. players
Orlando Pirates F.C. players
Moroka Swallows F.C. players
Cape Town Spurs F.C. players
Jomo Cosmos F.C. players
Maritzburg United F.C. players
Vitória F.C. players
RC Lens players
South African expatriate soccer players
Expatriate footballers in Portugal
Expatriate footballers in France
Expatriate footballers in Malaysia
South African expatriate sportspeople in Malaysia
Association football midfielders